A Game of Thrones is the first novel in George R. R. Martin's fantasy series A Song of Ice and Fire.

A Game of Thrones or Game of Thrones may also refer to:

Common uses
 A Game of Thrones (comics), a 2011 comic book adaptation of George R. R. Martin's fantasy novel
 Game of Thrones, an HBO television series, based on A Song of Ice and Fire
 A Song of Ice and Fire, the series of novels on which the television series Game of Thrones is based

Games
 A Game of Thrones (board game), a 2003 strategy board game
 A Game of Thrones (card game), a 2002 card game
 A Game of Thrones: Second Edition (card game), a 2015 card game
 A Game of Thrones (role-playing game), a 2005 tabletop role-playing game
 A Game of Thrones: Genesis, a 2011 strategy video game developed by Cyanide
 Game of Thrones (2012 video game), a 2012 action role-playing video game developed by Cyanide
 Game of Thrones (2014 video game), a 2014 episodic video game developed by Telltale Games
 Game of Thrones Ascent, a 2013 strategy video game developed by Disruptor Beam
 Game of Thrones: Seven Kingdoms, a canceled browser-based MMORPG developed by Bigpoint Games
 Reigns: Game of Thrones, a 2018 strategy video game developed by Nerial
 Game of Thrones: Winter Is Coming, a 2019 video game

See also

 A Clash of Kings (disambiguation)
 War of succession, the political and martial games of obtaining the throne
 Power politics, the political and martial power games played by the enthroned